Frank Edwin Wright III (born December 9, 1972), better known by his stage name Tré Cool, is a German-born American musician, singer, and songwriter best known as the drummer for the punk rock band Green Day. He replaced the band's former drummer, John Kiffmeyer, in 1990 as Kiffmeyer felt that he should focus on college. Cool has also played in The Lookouts, Samiam, Dead Mermaids, Bubu and the Brood and the Green Day side projects The Network and the Foxboro Hot Tubs.

Life and career
Frank Edwin Wright III was born in Frankfurt, West Germany, to Frank Edwin Wright Jr. and Linda Wright. He lived in Willits, California, with his father and elder sister Lori. He has German heritage, and his father was a helicopter pilot during the Vietnam War. Wright's closest neighbor was Larry Livermore, who at the time was the singer of the punk band The Lookouts. When Wright was 12, Livermore recruited him as the drummer of The Lookouts and Tre took on the name of "Tré Cool", using both the French word "très" (meaning "very") and the English word "cool" as a way of saying he was "very cool". Trey, a play on Wright's family's generational titles, had already been Wright's nickname prior to the addition of "Cool."

When Green Day's drummer, John Kiffmeyer, left the band, the group recruited Tré Cool to be their drummer. In his second year, Tré Cool dropped out of high school and opted to earn a GED. He began taking classes at a local community college but would again drop out as the band became a more time-consuming priority. During this time the band considered breaking up because it took a long time to adjust to playing with Tré Cool.
 
Tré Cool's father was supportive and overhauled a bookmobile to transport the band. He would later say: "I watched them go from a bunch of kids to a group of musicians with work ethic," also adding: "On their first tour or two, it was more of a party than anything else. I still scratch my head and say, 'How in the hell did they make it?' They used to practice in my living room here – a lot of the songs they did on Dookie. You hear it coming together, and you don't expect people are going to go out and buy it. But when it does, you just say, 'Wow that's so cool.'"

In 1998, after Green Day won a "Moon Man" Trophy at the MTV Music Awards, Tré Cool famously climbed on the Universal Globe at Universal Studios. He and Jai Brooks are the only two people to ever do this.

Tré Cool won "Best Punk Drummer" in DRUM! Magazine's 2011 Drummies, which recognizes some of the best drummers across music genres. He was also featured in the Nitpick Six: The Six Best Drum Fills and ranked in at number 6 for the intro to "Basket Case". In 2014, LA Weekly named Tré Cool #2 of the "Top 5 Punk Drummers of All Time".

On April 18, 2015, Cool and his Green Day bandmates were inducted into the Rock and Roll Hall of Fame in their first year of eligibility.

During early 2020, Cool sat in with Willie Nelson and his band after the death of Nelson's friend and drummer Paul English.

Musical style
Before joining Green Day, Tré Cool employed a more intricate drumming style.  He explained that "When I started, I had too many drums. I was a little reggae-happy and into fancier beats than was needed. It took me a while to get it: play the song, don't play the instrument. I started figuring out how to make the band a stronger unit, to make it jump." After playing with Green Day bassist Mike Dirnt, Tré Cool adopted a more rhythmic style with fewer drum fills to match Dirnt's bass lines.

Greg Kot of the Chicago Tribune referred to Tré Cool as "Green Day's most potent weapon", adding that "His monstrous kick-drum wallop evokes John Bonham, while his manic fills make him punk's answer to Keith Moon." His stage persona has also been compared to Moon. Sound engineer Neill King, who worked with Green Day on Dookie, noted that Tré Cool shares Moon's "wild animal approach" to playing drums, and explained that the band encountered difficulties while recording "Basket Case" due to his unpredictable style: "It's not that Tré wasn’t a good drummer, but in terms of his performances we wanted the best of the best...So, although we wanted him to do all of his wild fills and crazy drumming, we couldn’t just let him go. He’d drift in and out of time, which is terrific live, but which was unacceptable on radio at that time."

Influences
During a speech at Green Day's Rock and Roll Hall of Fame induction in 2015, Cool credited Ringo Starr from the Beatles, Keith Moon from The Who, John Bonham from Led Zeppelin, Mitch Mitchell from The Jimi Hendrix Experience, Charlie Watts from The Rolling Stones, jazz and big band drummer Buddy Rich, John Wright from NoMeansNo, Alex Van Halen from Van Halen, Dave Mello from Operation Ivy, Al Schvitz from MDC, and Aaron Elliot from Crimpshrine and Pinhead Gunpowder as his favorite drummers. Green Day performed the Beatles hit "Boys" with Starr at the Rock and Roll Hall of Fame ceremony that same year, in which Cool drummed alongside his idol.

Singing and songwriting
He also sang on "That Girl's from Outer Space" and "Sonny Boy" from Lookouts album Spy Rock Road. He then sang and played the guitar on "Dominated Love Slave" from Kerplunk and the hidden track "All by Myself" from Dookie, both of which he wrote and composed (on "Dominated Love Slave", guitarist and vocalist Billie Joe Armstrong played drums). He wrote and sang the subtrack "Rock and Roll Girlfriend" from the medley "Homecoming" featured on the album American Idiot. He also sang and wrote the track "DUI" ("Driving Under the Influence"), which was recorded for Green Day's fifth studio album Nimrod (1997) and was due to be released on the compilation album Shenanigans in 2002, but was omitted and can only be found on promotional unmastered copies of the album and online.

During a radio interview at Washington DC's alternative station DC 101, Tré Cool sang and played acoustic guitar on a short song entitled "Like a Rat Does Cheese", a song about the pleasure of fellatio.

Several live tracks also exist, usually from around 1993, such as "Food Around the Corner", a song from the 1943 Elmer Fudd cartoon An Itch in Time. Another live track, "Billie Joe's Mom" was also recorded.

Tré Cool has also recorded a version of Tay Zonday's "Chocolate Rain".

He also sang on The Network song "Hungry Hungry Models", "Asphyxia" "Flat Earth", "Respirator", "Squatter", "That's How They Get You", "The Stranger", and "Hey Elon" as The Snoo.

Discography
 Kerplunk! (1991) – drums, percussion, lead vocals and guitar on "Dominated Love Slave"
 Dookie (1994) – drums, percussion, lead vocals and guitar on "All by Myself"
 Insomniac (1995) – drums, percussion
 Nimrod (1997) – drums, percussion, backing vocals
 Warning (2000) – drums, percussion, accordion
 American Idiot (2004) – drums, percussion, backing vocals, lead vocals on "Rock and Roll Girlfriend"
 21st Century Breakdown (2009) – drums, percussion
 ¡Uno! (2012) – drums, percussion
 ¡Dos! (2012) – drums, percussion
 ¡Tré! (2012) – drums, percussion
 Revolution Radio (2016) – drums, percussion
 Father of All Motherfuckers (2020) – drums, percussion

DVD 
 Bullet in a Bible (film; 2005) – himself
 Awesome as Fuck (film; 2011) – himself

The Lookouts
 One Planet One People (1987) – drums, vocals, lead vocals on "The Mushroom Is Exploding"
 Spy Rock Road (1989) – drums, lead vocals on "That Girl's from Outer Space" and "Sonny Boy"

Foxboro Hot Tubs
 Stop Drop and Roll!!! (2008) – drums

The Network
 Money Money 2020 (2003) – drums, lead vocals on "Hungry Hungry Models" (as The Snoo)
Money Money 2020 Part II: We Told Ya So! (2020) – drums, lead vocals on "Asphyxia", "Flat Earth", "Respirator", "Squatter", "That's How They Get You", "The Stranger", and "Hey Elon" (as The Snoo)

Other media appearances
 King of the Hill (TV series; 1997) – Cane Skretteberg
 Jackass Backyard BBQ (TV special; 2002) – himself 
 Riding in Vans with Boys (film; 2003) – himself
 Live Freaky! Die Freaky! (film; 2006) – The Maid
 The Simpsons Movie (film; 2007) – himself
 Heart Like a Hand Grenade (film; 2008) – himself
 Green Day: Rock Band (video game; 2010) – himself (voice, likeness, and archive footage)
 ¡Cuatro! (film; 2013) as himself
 Broadway Idiot (film; 2013) – himself
 Fred Armisen: Standup for Drummers (Netflix Special; 2018) – himself

See also
 List of drummers
 Lookout Records

References

External links

 
 DRUM! Magazine's interview with Tre Cool
 Tre Cool at BehindTheDrums.com contains discography and equipment list

1972 births
Living people
Alternative rock drummers
American alternative rock musicians
American punk rock drummers
American male drummers
American punk rock musicians
Green Day members
Musicians from Oakland, California
People from Willits, California
20th-century American drummers
21st-century American drummers
Samiam members